Rank comparison chart of officers for navies of African states.

Officers

Warrant Officers

See also
Comparative navy officer ranks of the Americas
Ranks and insignia of NATO navies officers

References

Military comparisons

Naval ranks